Lobesia virulenta is a moth of the family Tortricidae. It was described by Bae & Komai in 1991. It is found from northern Europe to Japan (Hokkaido, Honshu, Shikoku).

The wingspan is 10–13 mm. The forewings are white ochreous, suffused with plumbeous and with yellowish ochreous markings. The hindwings are pale greyish white. Adults are on wing from May to September.

The larvae feed on Pyrus (including Pyrus serotina), Larix (including Larix leptolepis) and Angelica species. They have been recorded feeding on the fruit of pear, but are also recorded living in the gall of Ceratovacuna nekoashi on Styrax japonicus, feeding on the inner walls of the gall.

Subspecies
Lobesia virulenta virulenta (Japan)
Lobesia virulenta mieana Falck & Karsholt, 1998 (Europe)

References

Moths described in 1991
Olethreutini